Giovanni Correnti (8 June 1940 – 13 October 2016) was an Italian lawyer and politician, who served as Senator (1988–1992), Deputy (1992–1994) and Mayor of Novara (1997–2001).

References

1940 births
2016 deaths
Mayors of Novara
Deputies of Legislature XI of Italy
Senators of Legislature X of Italy
20th-century Italian politicians
21st-century Italian politicians
Italian Communist Party politicians
Democratic Party of the Left politicians
Democrats of the Left politicians